Murderers Club of Brooklyn is a 1967 German thriller film directed by Werner Jacobs and starring George Nader, Heinz Weiss, and Karel Stepanek. It was part of the Jerry Cotton series of films.

The film was shot at the Wandsbek Studios. Location shooting took place in Hamburg and New York City.

Plot
A gang of kidnappers is specialized in abducting children of top managers. Jerry Cotton's mission is to save the children and to arrest the gangsters. His first attempts backfire. One of the abducted kids gets killed and then Jerry's colleague Phil is taken hostage. Before he succeeds, Jerry has to discover the criminals have a secret partner on the inside.

Cast
George Nader as Jerry Cotton
Heinz Weiss as Phil Decker
Helmut Förnbacher as Bryan Dyers
Karel Štěpánek as Dyers
Helga Anders as Edna Cormick
Helmut Kircher as Burnie Johnson
Heinz Reincke as Sam
Helmuth Rudolph as Mr. Johnson
Dagmar Lassander as Jean Dyers
Wolfgang Weiser as Harry Long

References

External links

1960s crime thriller films
German crime thriller films
German sequel films
West German films
Films directed by Werner Jacobs
Films set in the United States
Films based on crime novels
Films based on German novels
Color sequels of black-and-white films
Constantin Film films
Films shot at Wandsbek Studios
1960s German films